Gift to the World is the debut full-length album by Boston, Massachusetts indie rock band Loveless.  It was released on Q Division Records in 2003.

The album was critically applauded by a number of publications, including Rolling Stone and The Boston Globe.  However, due to lack of promotion or touring around the album, its sales were mediocre, at best, for an independent album.  The album's life cycle was cut short in the summer of 2004, when it was announced Jen Trynin was leaving the band.

Track listing

Personnel
Loveless
 Jennifer Trynin – vocals, guitar
 Dave Wanamaker – vocals, guitar, keyboards
 Peter Armata – bass
 Tom Polce – drums

Additional personnel
 Matt Beaudoin – engineer, programming
 Rudyard Lee Cullers – assistant engineer
 Brian Dawson – studio assistant
 Mike Denneen – keyboards, engineer, mixing, producer
 Vic Firth – drum sticks
 Bill Guerra – backing vocals
 Paul Q. Kolderie – wardrobe
 Carl Plaster – drum technician 
 Rafi Sofer – studio assistant
 Jonathan Wyner – mastering

References 

2003 albums
Loveless (American band) albums